Te Roopu Raranga Whatu o Aotearoa or Māori Weavers New Zealand is the New Zealand national Māori weavers’ collective, which aims to foster and preserve Māori traditional textiles. It has played an important role in facilitating the gathering of weavers of Māori and Pacifica descent to meet, teach and learn from one another.

The collective was established when the wider collective of Aotearoa Moananui a Kiwa Weavers, founded by the Māori and South Pacific Arts Council in 1983, was split into the Māori and Pacifika portions of the organisation. This split came about as a result of funding reasons — current Toi Māori Aotearoa funding is specifically targeted at Māori arts. This split of groups occurred in 1994.

Te Roopu holds national hui (attendance of which is required by a number of tertiary courses), regional workshops, publishes a newsletter, coordinates with research funding agencies and publishes books.

Emily Schuster of Māori Arts and Crafts Institute in Rotorua was the first chairperson. Diggeress Te Kanawa was a co-founder. Cath Brown was also a founding member and went on to coordinate the production of the organisation's newsletter. Christina Wirihana is the current chairperson and Te Hemo Ata Henare is the deputy chair.

There is some overlap of personnel and events with Maori Women's Welfare League, but the League has a much broader remit, longer history and more political outlook.

National hui 
The national hui is held biennially at Labour Weekend at different Marae around the country. 
1983 Pakirikiri Marae, Tokomaru Bay
1985 Kokohinau Marae, Te Teko
1987 Tunohopu, Rotorua
1988 Omaka Marae, Blenheim
1990 Apumoana Marae, Rotorua
1992 Taurua Marae, Rotoiti, Rotorua
1993 Parihaka Marae, Taranaki
1995 Te Reo Nihi marae, Te Hāpua
1997 Takahanga Marae, Kaikohe
1999 Pakirikiri Marae, Tokomaru Bay
2001 Kokohinau Marae, Te Teko
2003 Awhitu Marae, Palmerston North
 2005 Owae Marae, Waitara
 2007 Maraenui Marae, Te Kaha
 2009 Takitimu Marae, Wairoa
 2011 Maketu Marae, Kawhia
2013 Rautahi Marae, Kawerau
2015 Roma Marae, Ahipara
2017 Te Wai-iti Marae, Rotoiti, Rotorua
2019 Ngā Hau e Whā Marae, Christchurch

Further reading 
 The gathering : a collection of writings from the weavers newsletters of Te Roopu Raranga Whatu o Aotearoa = Ngā kohikohinga. Brown, Cath., Waru, Bert., Nicholas, Garry., Toi Māori Aotearoa (Organization), Te Roopu Raranga/Whatu o Aotearoa. Wellington, N.Z.: Toi Māori Aotearoa. 2002. . OCLC 155933249.
Mai te whenua = Of the land. Te Roopu Raranga Whatu o Aotearoa. Rotorua Museum of Art & History. 2010 OCLC 696636700
Whiri toi : creation of our minds and hands in art. Lala Rolls; Island Productions.; Toi Māori Aotearoa.; Te Roopu Raranga Whatu o Aotearoa.; Creative New Zealand.
 He rito, he ranga : kiekie : our taonga plant. Wellington : Te Roopu Raranga Whatu o Aotearoa. Toi Maori Aotearoa, 2009. 
 Whatu Kākahu: Māori Cloaks Awhina Tamarapa (ed.), Te Roopu Raranga Whatu o Aotearoa. Te Papa Press. 2011.

References 

Professional associations based in New Zealand
Māori culture
Cultural organisations based in New Zealand
Textile arts of New Zealand
Weaving